Dvorska Luda (born Andrija Krivokapić; 25 December 1985) is a Montenegrin rapper, record producer and beatmaker based in Bar, Montenegro. He is a member of the hip-hop group Barska Stoka.

Discography
 Krvna osveta (2007)
 Dvorska Luda predstavlja: Ples sa vragom (2009)
 naVAMga (2009)
 Skoro Svi (2010)
 Strip (2010)

With Psiho Mistik
Zbog vlasti (2009)

Singles
 Konza šnostra 2009a (2009)

References

1985 births
Montenegrin hip hop musicians
Living people